"Morgen" is a popular song (1959), originally performed in German by Croatian singer Ivo Robić and The Song-Masters, accompanied by Bert Kaempfert and his orchestra.

Background
"Morgen" was written by Peter Moesser, the song became a hit in West Germany, and later on the US charts in 1959 where it peaked at #13.

Other recordings
English versions, titled "One More Sunrise" (lyrics by Noel Sherman), were issued as singles by Leslie Uggams, and Vera Lynn and other performers of the era: the only artist to reach the UK Top 20 with his version of the song was Dickie Valentine who spent 7 weeks therein from October to December 1959, peaking at No 14.
The Ventures recorded an instrumental version to open their first album in 1960, Walk, Don't Run, on Dolton BLP 2003 (monaural)/BST 8003 (stereo).
Bing Crosby included the song in his 1961 album Holiday in Europe and Petula Clark sang the song on her 1965 album The World's Greatest International Hits.
Ray Conniff recorded an instrumental version which was part of his album "'S Continental" (Columbia Records CS 8576) released in 1961.
Bert Kaempfert recorded an instrumental version for the U.S. version of his album "The Wonderland of B. K." for Decca Records in 1961.

References

1959 singles
German-language songs
Polydor Records singles
Laurie Records singles
The Ventures songs
Petula Clark songs
Bing Crosby songs
1959 songs
Songs with lyrics by Noel Sherman

Croatian songs